Ralph Vibert OBE (November 7, 1911 – November 10, 2008) was Solicitor General of Jersey (1948–1955) and a Senator of the States of Jersey (1959–1987).

World War II
Before the Second World War he was secretary to the future Bailiff of Jersey, Alexander Coutanche. During the War he served as a cypher instructor with the Special Operations Executive (SOE) in Beaulieu, New Forest before being promoted to Chief instructor of Force 136, the Asian outpost of the SOE in India.

After the War
Upon returning to Jersey after its liberation was appointed Solicitor General of Jersey, where he served from 1948 to 1955 when he resigned due to personal differences with the then Attorney General. In 1957 he was elected a Deputy for St. Brelade; and in 1959 was elected a Senator of the States of Jersey, a position he held until his retirement in 1987. 
During this time in elected office he was President of the following committees: Defence (1967–1987), Legislation (1966–1981), Constitution and Common Market (1967–87), Industrial Relations (1972–1975), Establishment (1975–1980), Finance (1980–1984), Policy Advisory (1984–1987), Defence Contribution (1984–1987). During his presidency of the Constitution and Common Market Committee he was the author of the constitutional position that Jersey enjoys of being outside the then EEC (now EU), but within the common external tariff.

References

1911 births
2008 deaths
Senators of Jersey
Officers of the Order of the British Empire